Dongxihu District is one of 13 urban districts of the prefecture-level city of Wuhan, the capital of Hubei Province, China, forming part of the city's western suburbs. It lies on the north (left) bank of the Han River. Along with Qiaokou, it is the only district of Wuhan to not have a Yangtze River shoreline; it borders the districts of Huangpi to the northeast, Jiang'an to the east, Jianghan, Qiaokou, and Hanyang to the southeast, and Caidian to the southwest. The district also borders the prefecture-level city of Xiaogan to the north and west.

Geography

Administrative Divisions

Dongxihu District currently administers eight subdistricts, one administrative committee, and three local offices:

Transportation
Wuhan Metro Line 1 have 5 stations in Dongxihu District.

Wuhan Metro Line 2 passes through Dongxihu District. There are 4 stations of Line 2 in Dongxihu District: Hongtu Boulevard station, Changqingcheng station, Jinyintan station and Changqing Huayuan station.

The northern end of Line 6 runs in Dongxihu District. There are 10 stations of Line 6 in Dongxihu District: Xincheng 11th Road station, Matoutan Park station, Five Rings Sports Center station, Erya Road station, Haikou 3rd Road station, Jinyinhu Park station, Jinyinhu station, Garden Expo North station, Polytechnic University station and Changqing Huayuan station.

References

External links

Geography of Wuhan
County-level divisions of Hubei